Amina Nababi (born 1998 or 1999), also spelled Aminah Nababi, is a Ugandan footballer who plays as a midfielder for FUFA Women Super League club Makerere University WFC and the Uganda women's national team.

Club career
Nababi has played for Makerere University in Uganda.

International career
Nababi capped for Uganda at senior level during the 2019 CECAFA Women's Championship and the 2021 COSAFA Women's Championship.

International goals
Scores and results list Uganda goal tally first

References

External links

1990s births
Living people
Ugandan women's footballers
Women's association football midfielders
Uganda women's international footballers